Bronislovas Lubys (8 October 1938 – 23 October 2011) was a Lithuanian entrepreneur, former Prime Minister of Lithuania, signatory of the Act of the Re-Establishment of the State of Lithuania, and businessman.

Lubys was born in Plungė. He was CEO and main shareholder of the Lithuanian company Achema. As of August 2008, he was the richest Lithuanian, according to the Lithuanian magazine Veidas.

Lubys died of a heart attack while riding a bicycle in Druskininkai on 23 October 2011.

References

External links 

Bronislovas Lubys on the website of Lithuanian Confederation of Industrialists
Bronislovas Lubys on the website of Plungė district municipality

Prime Ministers of Lithuania
Lithuanian businesspeople
Lithuanian mass media owners
1938 births
People from Plungė
2011 deaths
Commanders of the Order of Merit of the Republic of Poland
Kaunas University of Technology alumni
20th-century Lithuanian businesspeople
21st-century Lithuanian businesspeople